Rafiah Yam was an Israeli settlement, in the Gaza Strip until 2005.

History
Rafiah Yam was originally established in 1984 as a secular community in the southern end of the Gush Katif settlement bloc, only 200 metres from the Egyptian border and close to the Palestinian city of Rafah.

Residents of the settlement worked mainly in agriculture. Being one of the few non-Orthodox settlements, the community children were bused each day to school in the nearby Eshkol region outside the Gaza Strip.

Unilateral disengagement
The 30 families, including at least 150 people, of Rafiah Yam were forcibly evicted from their homes by the Israel Defense Forces and Israeli Police as part of the Israel's unilateral disengagement plan, in August 2005. Their houses and other structures were destroyed and the area was abandoned. 

Former Israeli settlements in the Gaza Strip
Populated places established in 1984
1991 establishments in the Palestinian territories
2005 disestablishments in the Palestinian territories